Roman Machulenko (born 26 July 1992 in Boryspil, Kyiv Oblast, Ukraine) is a professional Ukrainian football striker who played for OKS Stomil Olsztyn in the I liga (Poland).

Machulenko played for different Ukrainian clubs and in August 2014 signed deal with the Polish club OKS Stomil Olsztyn.

References

External links

1992 births
Living people
People from Boryspil
Ukrainian footballers
NK Veres Rivne players
FC CSKA Kyiv players
FC Lviv players
FC Sevastopol players
FC Desna Chernihiv players
OKS Stomil Olsztyn players
Zawisza Bydgoszcz players
Ukrainian Premier League players
Ukrainian expatriate footballers
Expatriate footballers in Poland
Ukrainian expatriate sportspeople in Poland
Association football forwards
Sportspeople from Kyiv Oblast